WMQX (102.3 FM, "Max 102") is a commercial FM radio station licensed to serve Pittston, Pennsylvania. The station is owned by Audacy, Inc., through licensee Audacy License, LLC, and airs a classic hits format branded as "Max 102".

WMQX uses HD Radio and broadcasts Audacy's LGBTQ talk and dance music service branded as "Channel Q" on its HD2 subchannel.

References

External links

MQX
Radio stations established in 1983
1983 establishments in Pennsylvania
Audacy, Inc. radio stations